LP Super Sport (Bulgarian: ЛП Супер Спорт София) is a Bulgarian women's football club from the capital city Sofia, currently playing in the Bulgarian AFG, the top division of Bulgarian women's football.

Current squad
Vesselina Tepeshanova
Vanya Krastanova
Alexandra Shehtova
Gergana Teneva
Martina Apostolova
Angelina Angelova
Veronica Mincheva
Teodora Kodova
Gergana Todorova
Desislava Grahliova
Nely Atanasova
Eli Nadjakova
Kremena Prodanova
Martina Kioseva
Eva Slancheva
Monika Vouteva
Maria Keleva
Victoria Mihailova
Yordanka Artokova
Lora Dimitrova
Antonina Simeonova

Titles
 Bulgarian Cup Winner - 2003, 2005, 2006.
 Bulgarian Champion - 2004.

External links
 Official website

Super Sport
2001 establishments in Bulgaria
Football clubs in Sofia
Association football clubs established in 2001